Rodney Allen Rippy (born July 29, 1968) is a former American child actor, television personality, marketing director, producer, and politician. He appeared in TV commercials for the fast-food chain Jack in the Box in the early 1970s, as well as in numerous roles in television and movies.

Early career
In the Jack in the Box advertisements, Rippy was seen trying to wrap his mouth around the super-sized Jumbo Jack hamburger. The tag line "It's too big to eat!" (pronounced "It's too big-a-eat!") became a catchphrase. Another spot showed Rippy giggling while singing the song "Take Life a Little Easier," which was released as a single by Bell Records in the fall of 1973 in the wake of the commercial's popularity.

The single (b/w "World of Love") appeared on the Billboard magazine "Bubbling Under" chart in October 1973, peaking at #112. At the age of five, Rippy became the youngest person ever to make any Billboard music chart. An LP, also titled Take Life a Little Easier (Bell 1311), was released in 1974.

Rippy subsequently had guest roles in many popular television shows, including The Six Million Dollar Man, Marcus Welby, M.D., Police Story, and The Odd Couple (Rodney played himself and was the owner of the building where Oscar and Felix lived). He also appeared frequently on talk shows such as The Tonight Show Starring Johnny Carson and Dinah's Place with Dinah Shore. Rippy also had a co-starring role on the CBS Saturday morning children's show The Harlem Globetrotters Popcorn Machine.

Rodney made his big screen debut (uncredited, filmed before the Jack in the Box spots) in the Mel Brooks comedy Blazing Saddles in 1974. He portrayed a young Sheriff Bart aboard his parents' buckboard wagon after a brutal Sioux nation attack. When the Sioux chief, portrayed by Brooks, allows the pioneers' passage (for being darker than the Sioux are), Rippy says his only line, "Thank you." In a Peanuts newspaper comic strip dated July 3, 1974, Snoopy awakens from a dream in which he "had been invited out to dinner by Rodney Allen Rippy!"

Later career
Rippy graduated from Cerritos College in 1990 and California State University, Dominguez Hills in 1995 where he majored in marketing. In 2000 he opened his own marketing firm which he named Ripped Marketing Group. He worked on campaigns such as promoting leisure wear and country music, among other projects. He has taken on a few acting roles since his childhood stardom, filming a few episodes of Parker Lewis Can't Lose in the early 1990s, appearing in the 1997 independent film, Former Child Star and the 2003 David Spade comedy Dickie Roberts: Former Child Star.

Rippy is a partner in the film production company Bow Tie Productions, and spokesman for Hurricane Housing Relief. He worked at KABC-TV in Los Angeles, California. A resident of Carson, California, he has served as master of ceremonies for the Carson Relay For Life (Rippy's mother died of cancer in 1986). He was at one time a national director of marketing with Metro Networks (Westwood One).

Political candidacy
In 2015 Rippy was a candidate for mayor of Compton, California. He was eliminated by finishing 10th out of 12 candidates in the election's primary.

Partial filmography

References

External links
Interview on BTS with PhillySnaps
Jack in the Box commercial on YouTube

 https://howiegoestohollywood.com

1968 births
Living people
20th-century American male actors
Male actors from Long Beach, California
African-American male actors
Film producers from California
American male child actors
American male film actors
American male television actors
Bell Records artists
California State University, Dominguez Hills alumni
People from Carson, California
Jack in the Box
20th-century African-American people
21st-century African-American people